Light Extracts is an album by Norwegian guitarist Eivind Aarset's Électronique Noire

Background 
This is the second solo album by the Norwegian guitarist Eivind Aarset for Bugge Wesseltoft's Jazzland label, and as a follow up of the well received debut album Électronique Noire, it had much to live up to, and did not disappoint. Also this time ambience and club rhythms are present, but the music lives a life of itself and has become a truly separate organism. Light Extracts is an album from the top shelf.

AllMusic critique Thom Jurek, in his review of Aarset's album Light Extracts states:

Reception
The AllMusic reviewer Thom Jurek awarded the album 4.5 stars, and the reviewer Terje Mosnes of the Norwegian newspaper Dagbladet awarded the album dice 4.

Track listing
«Empathic Guitar» (4:25)
«Wolf Extract» (8:20) Bass Clarinet – Hans Ulrik Electric piano – Arve Furset
«Dust Kittens» (5:26) Arranging (co-arranging) – Nick Sillito
«The String Thing» (7:40) Electric bass – Eivind Aarset
«Between Signal & Noise» (8:33) Bass clarinet – Hans Ulrik Electric piano – Arve Furset
«Ffwd / Slow Motion» (6:23)	
«Self Defence» (4:33) Composer – Eivind Aarset, Marius Reksjø & Wetle Holte
«Tunnel Church» (6:44) Trumpet – Nils Petter Molvær

Credits
Drums, drum programming, electronics – Wetle Holte
Electric bass, acoustic bass – Marius Reksjø (tracks: 1-3, 5-7)
Electronics, mixing – Reidar Skår
Guitar, fretless guitar, electronics, programming, edition – Eivind Aarset
Mastering – Mikkel Schille
Photography (cover photos) – Fin Serck-Hanssen
Recording – Eivind Aarset & Reidar Skår
Composer – Eivind Aarset (tracks: 1-6, 8)
Cover design – www.kornstad.com

Notes
Recorded at 7 Etg. and at home
Mastered at Lydmuren

References

External links
Eivind Aarset Official Website

Eivind Aarset albums
1998 albums